Hendrik Coenraad Blöte (12 February 1900 – 20 January 1990) was an entomologist, malacologist and crustaceologist. As an entomological authority he is cited as Blöte.

Biography

Early years
Blöte was born in the Dutch city of Leiden, the son of Catharina Brüggeman and the physician Hendrik Willem Blöte. He obtained his degree from Leiden University in 1927.

Career
After graduating in October 1927, Blöte was appointed as a curator of Crustaceae and Mollusca in November the same year and was also responsible for part of the entomological collections, the Coleoptera and Hemiptera. In 1929 he was promoted to second curator in entomology and continued in a supervisory capacity until September 1929. He obtained his PhD in 1935 with a dissertation titled, "Remarks on Biogeography". Blöte continued to specialise in entomology, focusing on the Hemiptera collection.

Legacy
Blöte worked on multiple groups during his career and described more than 200 species new to science including many Coreoidea.

Works
This is an incomplete list:
 Blöte H. C., 1933. New Pyrrhocoridae in the Collection of the British Museum (Natural History). Annals and Magazine of Natural History 10 11: 588-602 
 Blöte H. C., 1934. Catalogue of the Coreidae in the Rijksmuseum van Natuurlijke Historie. Part I. Corizinae, Alydinae. Zoölogische Mededeelingen 17: 253-285
 Blöte H. C., 1935. Catalogue of the Coreidae in the Rijksmuseum van Natuurlijke Historie. Part II. Coreinae, First Part. Zoölogische Mededeelingen 18: 181-227
 Blöte H. C., 1936. Catalogue of the Coreidae in the Rijksmuseum van Natuurlijke Historie. Part III.Coreinae, Second Part. Zoölogische Mededeelingen 19: 23-66  
 Blöte H. C., 1937. On African species of Leptocorixa Berthold. Temminckia 2: 281-296 
 Blöte H. C., 1938. Catalogue of the Coreidae in the Rijksmuseum van natuurlijke Historie. Part IV. Coreinae, Third part. Zoölogische Mededeelingen 20(25): 275-308

Gallery

Species described

 Acanthocoris acutus Blöte, 1935
 Acanthocoris declivicollis Blöte, 1935
 Acanthocoris elegans Blöte, 1935
 Acanthocoris erythraeensis Blöte, 1935
 Acanthocoris liberiensis Blöte, 1935
 Acanthocoris lineatus Blöte, 1935
 Acanthocoris major Blöte, 1935
 Acanthocoris mamillatus Blöte, 1935
 Acanthocoris rudis Blöte, 1935
 Acanthocoris speyeri Blöte, 1935
 Acanthotyla distinguenda Blöte, 1936
 Acanthotyla flexuosa (Blöte, 1936)
 Acidomeria brunnea (Blöte, 1935)
 Acidomeria dentipes (Blöte, 1935)
 Acidomeria tuberculicollis (Blöte, 1935)
 Amblypelta manihotis (Blöte, 1935)
 Anasa marginella Blöte, 1935
 Anasa sinuaticollis Blöte, 1935
 Aspilosterna elegantula (Blöte, 1938)
 Bloeteocoris inflexigena (Blöte, 1934)
 Brachylybas dimorpha Blöte, 1936
 Brachylybas inflexa Blöte, 1936
 Calyptohygia brevicollis (Blöte, 1933)
 Catorhintha bos Blöte, 1935
 Cebrenis cinnamomea Blöte, 1935
 Cletomorpha affinis Blöte, 1935
 Cletomorpha unifasciata Blöte, 1935
 Cletus angustus Blöte, 1935
 Cletus minutus Blöte, 1935
 Cletus similis Blöte, 1935
 Cloresmus boops Blöte, 1936
 Cloresmus jacobsoni Blöte, 1936
 Cosmoleptus sumatranus Blöte, 1934
 Cossutia validispina Blöte, 1938
 Daclera opaca Blöte, 1934
 Dalader distanti Blöte, 1938
 Dalmatomammurius cebrenoides (Blöte, 1935)
 Dasynus fumosus (Blöte, 1935)
 Dasynus kalshoveni Blöte, 1935
 Dasynus puncticeps Blöte, 1935
 Dasynus striatellus Blöte, 1935
 Elasmopoda elata Blöte, 1938
 Harmostes (Harmostes) Blöte, 1934
 Homalocolpura annulata Blöte, 1936
 Homalocolpura binotata Blöte, 1936
 Homalocolpura borneana Blöte, 1936
 Homalocolpura nitida Blöte, 1936
 Homalocolpura subopaca Blöte, 1936
 Homalocolpura vorax Blöte, 1936
 Homoeocerus (Anacanthocoris) adustus Blöte, 1936
 Homoeocerus (Anacanthocoris) nota Blöte, 1936
 Homoeocerus (Anacanthocoris) ochraceus Blöte, 1936
 Homoeocerus (Anacanthocoris) rufulus Blöte, 1936
 Homoeocerus (Anacanthocoris) tangens Blöte, 1936
 Homoeocerus (Tliponius) dallasi Blöte, 1936
 Homoeocerus (Tliponius) laterinotatus Blöte, 1936
 Homoeocerus (Tliponius) marginepunctatus Blöte, 1936
 Homoeocerus (Tliponius) pallescens Blöte, 1936
 Homoeocerus (Tliponius) pallidulus Blöte, 1936
 Homoeocerus (Tliponius) sumbawensis Blöte, 1936
 Hygia (Colpura) simalurensis Blöte, 1936
 Hygia (Hygia) pedestris Blöte, 1936
 Hygia (Microcolpura) flavitarsis Blöte, 1936
 Hygia (Pterocolpura) montana Blöte, 1936
 Hygia (Sphinctocolpura) forsteniana Blöte, 1936
 Hygia (Sphinctocolpura) minahassae Blöte, 1936
 Kennetus transversus Blöte, 1938
 Latimbus angulicollis Blöte, 1936
 Leptocoris minusculus Blöte, 1934
 Leptoglossus flavosignatus Blöte, 1936
 Leptoscelis flaviventris Blöte, 1936
 Mictis dilatipes (Blöte, 1938)
 Mictis tridentifer Blöte, 1938
 Molchina obtusidens Blöte, 1936
 Notobitus humeralis Blöte, 1936
 Oxypristis modestus Blöte, 1938
 Paradasynus acutispinus Blöte, 1935
 Physomerus flavicans Blöte, 1935
 Piezogaster herrichi (Blöte, 1938)
 Placophyllopus colthurnatus Blöte, 1938
 Prionolomia rudis Blöte, 1938
 Pternistria cerboides Blöte, 1938
 Pternistria waigeuensis Blöte, 1938
 Riptortus distinguendus Blöte, 1934
 Riptortus fuliginosus Blöte & Hagenbach, 1934
 Riptortus rubronotatus Blöte, 1934
 Salapia pretiosa Blöte, 1938
 Sciophyrella annulipes (Blöte, 1936)
 Sciophyroides flavoguttatus (Blöte, 1936)
 Sciophyropsis rugulosus (Blöte, 1936)
 Sphictyrtus similis Blöte, 1935
 Stenocoris (Erbula) elegans (Blöte, 1937)
 Stenocoris (Erbula) similis Blöte, 1937
 Stenocoris (Pseudoleptocorisa) erraticus (Blöte, 1937)
 Stenocoris (Stenocoris) maculosus (Blöte, 1937)
 Stenocoris (Stenocoris) pallidus (Blöte, 1937)
 Stenocoris (Stenocoris) sordidus (Blöte, 1937)
 Stenocoris (Stenocoris) v-nigrum (Blöte, 1937)
 Stictopleurus brevicornis Blöte, 1934
 Stictopleurus minutus Blöte, 1934
 Tachycolpura elongata (Blöte, 1936)
 Trematocoris acutangulus (Blöte, 1938)
 Trematocoris compactus (Blöte, 1938)
 Tuberculiformia subinermis (Blöte, 1934)
 Typhlocolpura vandervechti (Blöte, 1932)
 Vazquezitocoris inflexicollis (Blöte, 1935)
 Vittorius sumatranus Blöte, 1936
 Zicca impicta Blöte, 1935
 Zygometapodus castaneus (Blöte, 1938)

References

External links
Biographical & Type Information (no citations)

1900 births
1990 deaths
Leiden University alumni
Dutch entomologists
20th-century Dutch zoologists